Vadim Aleksandrovich Panin (born February 10, 1984) is a Russian professional basketball player who last played for Zenit Saint Petersburg of the VTB United League and the EuroCup. Standing at 2.03 m (6'8"), he plays at the small forward position.

Professional career
Panin has played with the following clubs in his pro career: Dynamo Moscow, Dynamo Moscow Region, Lokomotiv Rostov, Ural Great Perm, UNICS Kazan, Spartak Vladivostok, Triumph Lyubertsy, Khimki Moscow Region, and Nizhny Novgorod.

Russian national team
Panin was a member of the junior national teams of Russia.

References

External links
 Vadim Panin at draftexpress.com
 Vadim Panin at eurobasket.com
 Vadim Panin at euroleague.net
 Vadim Panin at fiba.com
 Vadim Panin at fibaeurope.com

1984 births
Living people
BC Dynamo Moscow players
BC Khimki players
BC Nizhny Novgorod players
BC Spartak Primorye players
BC UNICS players
BC Zenit Saint Petersburg players
PBC Lokomotiv-Kuban players
PBC Ural Great players
Russian men's basketball players
Shooting guards
Small forwards